The Language of God: A Scientist Presents Evidence for Belief is a bestselling book by Francis Collins in which he advocates theistic evolution. Collins is an American physician-geneticist, noted for his discoveries of disease genes, and his leadership of the Human Genome Project (HGP). He currently serves as the director of the US National Institutes of Health. In the book, Collins describes briefly the process by which he became a Christian.

Collins raises arguments for the idea of God, drawing from science and philosophy. He cites many famous thinkers, most prevalently C. S. Lewis, as well as Saint Augustine, Stephen Hawking, Charles Darwin, Theodosius Dobzhansky and others. In 2007 Christianity Today judged it one of the best books of the previous year.

BioLogos
The book proposes the name "BioLogos" as a new term for theistic evolution. The term has not gotten wide usage for the position, but instead became the name of the science and faith organization Collins founded in November 2007. The organization BioLogos now prefers the term evolutionary creation to describe its position.

Bios is the Greek word for "life". Logos is Greek for "word", with a broader meaning in Heracleitean philosophy and Stoicism—namely the rational principle ordering the universe. This concept was appropriated by Christian theology. In Christian theology, "Word" is actually a creative agent for all that exists, in addition to being an ordering principle. Furthermore, in some Christian thinking the eternal and divine Logos merged and synthesized with a human nature to become Jesus Christ in the Incarnation. This is laid out in the opening prologue of the Gospel of John, forming part of the textual basis for Christian belief in the Trinity, as the concept of Logos morphed over time into God the Son for the second person of the Trinity.

"BioLogos" expresses the belief that God is the source of all life and that life expresses the will of God. BioLogos represents the view that science and faith co-exist in harmony.

Description
Collins' conversion to Christianity is detailed at the beginning and end of The Language of God. He grew up in an agnostic family, and knew at an early age that he wanted to be a scientist. At first, he was interested in the physical sciences, since "biology was rather like existential philosophy: it just didn't make sense" (page 181). However, nearing the end of a Ph.D. program, Collins took a biochemistry course and was hooked. He applied for and was admitted to medical school, from which he graduated and began genetic research and a clinical practice. During one clinic, Collins was asked by a Christian patient about his spiritual beliefs. He did not really have an answer, but determined that he should confirm his atheism by studying the best arguments for faith. A pastor directed him to Mere Christianity by C. S. Lewis, which he cites as the main cause of his conversion.

Another section of The Language of God focuses on 'The Moral Law Argument.' Moral Law is very important for Collins: "After twenty-eight years as a believer, the Moral Law stands out for me as the strongest signpost of God" (p. 218). Moral Law is an argument for the existence of a God. What is the Moral Law? Collins quotes C. S. Lewis, "the denunciation of oppression, murder, treachery, falsehood and the injunction of kindness to the aged, the young, and the weak, almsgiving, impartiality, and honesty." Collins has two main arguments: one is that all cultures and religions of the world endorse a universal, absolute and timeless Moral Law. It is overwhelmingly documented in the "Encyclopedia of Religion and Ethics." According to Collins, it is a unique property that separates humans and animals. The Moral Law includes altruism which is more than just reciprocity ("You scratch my back, and I'll scratch yours"). His second argument is: "Selfless altruism presents a major challenge for the evolutionist" (p. 27).

Collins argues that science and faith can be compatible. In an interview on the Point of Inquiry podcast he told D. J. Grothe that “the scientific method and the scientific worldview can't be allowed to get distorted by religious perspectives”, but he does not think “being a believer or a non-believer affects one's ability to do science”. He also said that "the faith Dawkins describes in the God Delusion isn't the faith I recognise", and that, like him, "most people are seeking a possible harmony between these worldviews [faith and science]"

Reception
The July 17 Publishers Weekly review reads: “This marvelous book combines a personal account of Collins’s faith and experiences as a genetics researcher with discussions of more general topics of science and spirituality, especially centering around evolution.” Robert K. Eberle summarizes his opinion of the book: "The Language of God is well written, and in many places quite thoughtful, but unless one is predisposed to the idea of theistic evolution, most will probably find the book unconvincing on this front."

Sam Harris saw Collins's waterfall experience (three frozen streams reminding him of the Trinity) as no more valid than would be a reminder to him (Harris) of the three mythical founders of Rome, argued that Collins's treatment of the evolution of altruism should have considered kin selection and exaptation, and challenged Collins's theodicy by arguing that rationalists should ask whether evidence suggests the existence of an omnipotent, omniscient, omnibenevolent God rather than whether it is compatible with it.

In contrast to Harris' criticisms, physicist Stephen M. Barr for First Things writes that Collins' book is meant to be "the story of how and why he came to believe in God...There are many conversion stories and many scientific autobiographies, but few books in which prominent scientists tell how they came to faith." Barr concludes that while "so many people on both sides are trying to foment a conflict between science and religion, Collins is a sorely needed voice of reason. His book may do more to promote better understanding between the worlds of faith and science than any other so far written."

References

External links
 The BioLogos Foundation
 The Language of God on BioLogos.org
 Decoding the Language of God: Can a Scientist Really Be a Believer?
 An extended, chapter-by-chapter review by atheist B.J. Marshall, on Patheos
  Book Review - Writing outside his field

Christian apologetic works
Books about religion and science
2006 non-fiction books